Bishopstone is a village and civil parish in the Swindon unitary authority of Wiltshire, England, about  east of Swindon, and on the county border with Oxfordshire. Since 1934 the parish has included the village of Hinton Parva.

Bishopstone lies on the north slope of the Lambourn Downs, overlooking the Vale of White Horse. It is between Wanborough and Ashbury on the historic Icknield Way.  The village has a public house, the Royal Oak, and a number of thatched cottages, centred on a mill-pond.

The village is often used as a base for walkers on the Ridgeway National Trail. The Ridgeway above Bishopstone is a byway open to motor vehicles between April and October.

On the downs above Bishopstone are medieval field systems known as lynchets and many other historic earth-workings.

References

External links

Bishopstone & Hinton Parva – parish website

Civil parishes in Wiltshire
Villages in Wiltshire
Borough of Swindon